Village Christian Academy is a private Christian school in Fayetteville, North Carolina, United States. It is located at 908 South McPherson Church Road. It is a Christian school founded by Village Baptist Church, although it is a non-denominational school, and uses the facilities of the church. The school has 550–650 students.

The school offers extended physical therapy services for Academical Gifted (AG) students and Academic Enrichment (AE) for students in need.

VCA's mascot is the Knights. It is also affiliated with FCA, TARS and NHS.

References

External links
Village Christian Academy

Christian schools in North Carolina
Schools in Cumberland County, North Carolina
Private high schools in North Carolina
Education in Fayetteville, North Carolina